Sebastian Nowak may refer to:
 Sebastian Nowak (footballer, born 1982), Polish football goalkeeper
 Sebastian Nowak (footballer, born 1975), Polish football defender